Robert Lamoureux (4 January 1920 – 29 October 2011) was a French actor, screenwriter and film director. He appeared in more than 30 films between 1951 and 1994. He starred in the film The Adventures of Arsène Lupin, which was entered into the 7th Berlin International Film Festival. He was married to the actress Magali Vendeuil.

Partial filmography

Le roi des camelots (1951) - Robert
 (1951) - Himself
Chacun son tour (1951) - Robert Montfort
Au fil des ondes (1951) - Himself
Allô... je t'aime (1952) - Pierre Palette
 Open Letter (1953) - Martial Simonet
 The Enchanting Enemy (1953) - Roberto Mancini
Saluti e baci (1953) - Himself
Women of Paris (1953) - Himself - Animateur de spectacle
Virgile (1953) - François Virgile
 Service Entrance (1954) - François Berthier
Papa, maman, la bonne et moi (1954) - Robert Langlois
Magic Village (1955) - Robert
Papa, maman, ma femme et moi (1955) - Robert Langlois
If Paris Were Told to Us (1956) - Latude
Meeting in Paris (1956) - Maurice Legrand
Une fée... pas comme les autres (1956) - Narrator
The Adventures of Arsène Lupin (1957) - André Laroche / Arsène Lupin / Aldo Parolini
L'amour est en jeu (1957) - Robert Fayard
 Life Together (1958) - Thierry Raval
Signé Arsène Lupin (1959) - Arsène Lupin / Le lieutenant André Laroche
La brune que voilà (1960) - Germain Vignon
Love and the Frenchwoman (1960) - Monsieur Desire / Frederic Leroy (segment "Femme seule, La")
 Ravishing (1960) - Thierry
Now Where Did the 7th Company Get to? (1973, director) - Colonel Blanchet
 Impossible Is Not French (1974) - The Gardener
Opération Lady Marlène (1975) - Le Général
The Seventh Company Outdoors (1977, director)
The Apprentice Heel (1977) - Antoine Chapelot
Le jour des rois (1991) - Albert

References

External links

1920 births
2011 deaths
French male film actors
French male screenwriters
French screenwriters
French film directors
Male actors from Paris
20th-century French male actors
20th-century French dramatists and playwrights
Officiers of the Légion d'honneur